The 1975 Constitution of the People's Republic of China was promulgated by the 4th National People's Congress. The offices of President and Vice-President were officially scrapped under the Constitution.

This Constitution reduced the total number of articles to just thirty, compared to 106 of articles in the 1954 Constitution of the People's Republic of China.

The 1975 Constitution witnessed an integration (in part) of the State Constitution (the PRC Constitution) and the Chinese Communist Party. The Constitution states that the People's Liberation Army, the armed services of the PRC, is to be controlled by the Central Committee of the Chinese Communist Party and Chairman of the Chinese Communist Party. Such linkage between party and state would no longer be seen in later Constitutions, particularly after 1982. The most significant link, however, came in Article 2, which stated that the Chinese Communist Party was the leading force of the Chinese people.

The 1975 Constitution remained in effect for about three years due to the death of Mao Zedong in 1976 and the seizing of power by Deng Xiaoping in the following years. It was thus the shortest-lived constitution in the history of the People's Republic of China.

External links 
 The Constitution of the People's Republic of China (1975)
 The Constitution of the People's Republic of China (1975)

Constitution of the People's Republic of China
Constitution
Constitution of China